Robert Matthew-Walker (born 23 July 1939) is an English composer, writer, editor marketer and broadcaster, mainly involved in classical music.

Robert Matthew-Walker was born in Lewisham, London, and studied at Goldsmiths College, the University of London, the London College of Music, and the London College of Printing (now University of the Arts, London). After leaving the Army in 1962, following service at the Joint Air Reconnaissance Intelligence Centre (JARIC), the War Office, and in North Africa, he studied composition privately with the French composer Darius Milhaud in Paris in 1962–63.

He was employed in the City as Company Secretary of Thom & Cook Ltd and founded the Tunnel Club rock venue in Greenwich in 1968.   He joined CBS Records in 1970; three months later he was appointed head of their classical department in London.  In 1974 he became Director of Marketing for CBS, succeeding Clive Selwood. During his time there 14 of the company's singles were in the Top 50 and 7 of CBS's albums in the Top 20 in the same week.  He was later Director of Masterworks Marketing, Europe, for CBS in Paris.

In 1975 he joined RCA Records in London as Head of the Classical Department, where he was responsible for launching James Galway's career, and at one point, the company had three full-price classical albums in the Top 50 pop album charts at the same time.

He founded several specialist classical labels, including Phoenix Records, Trax Records, and AVM Classics – each of which has had at some point the number 1 best-selling classical album. Robert Matthew-Walker has produced over 130 albums, and won the Grand Prix du Disque of the Academie Charles Cros in 1980 for his recording of Brian Ferneyhough's Sonatas for String Quartet by the Berne String Quartet (the first recording of any of Ferneyhough's works), amongst several other recording awards for his work as a producer.  He compiled the first two series of '100 Greatest Classics' for Filmtrax, and for Stylus 'The Pavarotti Collection' (reissued by Decca as 'The Essential Pavarotti') which sold over 600,000 copies and reached no. 8 in the pop album charts. He also appeared with the disco rapper Adamski on a dance single, 'Kraktali Daze'.
 
Robert Matthew-Walker was for many years a member of The Critics' Circle. From 1984 to 1988 he edited the magazine Music and Musicians, and between 1996 and 2008 the UK Grieg Society's journal The Grieg Companion (Vols 1–12). In April 2009, he became the editor of Musical Opinion and its sister-publication The Organ; he is also a contributor to Classic Record Collector. He has broadcast many times, and in 1980, he wrote and presented an eight-part History of Classical Recording for BBC Radio. He has published sixteen books, not all of them on musical subjects, and which in total have sold half a million copies. He has also been a Fellow of the Atlantic Council of Great Britain.

As a composer, his substantial output includes six symphonies (1956-68), the Symphonic Variations for orchestra (1955), concertos for flute, horn, oboe and cello, four string quartets and various violin and piano sonatas. Works such as Days To Remember: Three Pieces for Rock Band (1966) and the Meditation on the Death of Elvis Presley (1980) reveal his parallel interest in rock music.

Bibliography

'Muhammad Ali: His Fights in the Ring', London (1978)
'Elvis Presley – A Study in Music' (1982)
'Simon and Garfunkel', Hippocrene Books (1983) 
'Rachmaninoff: His Life and Times', Omnibus Press (1984) 
'David Bowie – Theatre of Music' (1985)
'Madonna: The Biography', Pan books (1991) 
'The Symphonies of Robert Simpson' (vars. authors, ed. Matthew-Walker) (1991)
Alun Hoddinott on Record: A Composer and the Gramophone, DGR Books (1993) 
The Recordings of Edvard Grieg: A Tradition Captured, DGR Books (1993) 
Cincinnati Interludes (Sir Eugene Goossens, ed. R. Matthew-Walker), DGR Books (1995) 
Havergal Brian: Reminiscences and Observations, DGR Books (1995) 
Heartbreak Hotel: The Life and Music of Elvis Presley Castle Communications (1995) 
The Music of Vyacheslav Artyomov: An Introduction, DGR Books (1997) 
Broadway to Hollywood: the Musical and the Cinema (1998) 
Mahler's 'Das Lied Von Der Erde' – Analytical Aspects, DGR Books (2002) 
Sorrow, Tomorrow. A Story of London, DGR Books (2015)

References

1939 births
British music critics
Living people
British record producers
British writers